Brachytemnus is a genus of beetles belonging to the family Curculionidae.

Species:
 Brachytemnus pinipotens (Wollaston, 1867) 
 Brachytemnus ruptus Marshall, 1928

References

Curculionidae
Curculionidae genera